An ie tōga is a special finely woven mat that is an important item of cultural value in Samoa. They are commonly referred to in English as "fine mats" although they are never used as mats  as they only have a purely cultural value. Ie tōga are valued by the quality of the weave and the softness and shine of the material. They are made by women and form an important part of their role, identity and skill in their community.

Ie tōga have an unwoven fringe and a strip of red feathers. They are important in gift exchanges during cultural ceremonies and events including matai chief title bestowals, weddings and funerals. In this way, ie tōga are passed from family to family, sometimes for many years and are greatly valued. Historically, some ie tōga were so valuable they were given their own names. The process of making a fine ie tōga can take months of work and have been known to take years. The completion of ie tōga can involve a public celebration and presentation with the women parading and displaying their fine mats for all to see.

Cultural value

Ie tōga are never used as an actual floor mat in the western sense, functioning only as an item of cultural value. They represent most of the traditional wealth of Samoan families. They are exchanged and presented at weddings and funerals, and at special occasions such as the blessing of a newly built fale (house) or the opening of a new church. Ie tōga are sometimes worn at special occasions, around the waist, similar to a lavalava. At funerals ie tōga are given to the family of the deceased and gifts of mats and food are given in return. These exchanges display a mutual respect that enforces family (aiga) ties.

Process
The best quality of ie tōga are made from a variety of long leaved pandanus known as lauie. More common types of 'ie toga with a coarser weave are made from laufala, a variety of pandanus which has a darker green colour than the lauie plant. The pandanus are grown in village plantations. The long leaves are selected and cut from the plant and taken back to the village. The leaves are prepared by soaking in boiling water followed by drying and bleaching in the sun. Once dry, the leaves are rolled and tied into bundles in preparation for weaving. The long dried leaves are then slit into thin strips for weaving. In the 19th century, young women would start their own mats or complete ones started by older sisters. Today, it is more common for mats to be woven by a group of women working in a fale lalaga (weaving house). The decorative red feathers were originally from Samoan or Fijian collared lory birds, called "sega," but more modern examples use dyed chicken feathers.

Etymology
Toga words seems to be inspired by Dhaga which has same meaning in Sanskrit. The Samoan language orthography is not standardized like Tongan language or Hawaiian language in regards to macron ("faamamafa") accents and glottal stop ("komaliliu") consonants. Therefore, "ie toga" is usually spelled as "ie toga" rather than  "ie tōga" with the accentuated penultimate syllable.  Native speakers habitually recognize the proper pronunciation, but given the commonly unaccented spelling "toga" it is common to see the term associated with "Toga," the Samoan spelling of Tonga. Hence the inaccurate explanation that "ie tōga" means "Tongan mat." The actual translation of "tōga" is "treasured" or "valuable" and the term also refers collectively to prestige goods produced by women for ceremonial exchanges. Conversely, men's goods produced for such exchanges were traditionally called "oloa."
This usage is corroborated in Tonga where these types of fine mats are referred to as "kie Haamoa" (Samoan mat) and "kie hingoa" ("named mats"), from the Samoan tradition of giving especially precious mats titular names. The Tongan cognate of "ie tōga" is "kie tōonga," while " oloa" and "koloa" are also cognates.

See also
Ta'ovala, Tongan dress and fine mat.
Fa'a Samoa, Samoan culture and way of life.
Fa'amatai, chiefly system of Samoa.
Culture of Samoa
Architecture of Samoa

References

Churchward: Tongan dictionary, 1959

External links
 Images of ie tōga in the collection of the Museum of New Zealand Te Papa Tongarewa

Samoan culture
Polynesian clothing
Samoan words and phrases
History of Oceanian clothing